Narmada Chandra Roy was a Revolutionary Socialist Party politician and a seven-time MLA from Kushmandi in Dakshin Dinajpur district.

Born on 5 March 1956 to Jatindranath Roy, he is a graduate.

Narmada Chandra Roy was elected to the West Bengal Legislative Assembly from Kushmandi in 1987, 1991, 1996, 2001, 2006 and 2011., 2016.

He died on 1 June 2021, Due to covid-19.

References

Revolutionary Socialist Party (India) politicians
Living people
West Bengal MLAs 1987–1991
West Bengal MLAs 1991–1996
West Bengal MLAs 1996–2001
West Bengal MLAs 2001–2006
West Bengal MLAs 2006–2011
West Bengal MLAs 2011–2016
West Bengal MLAs 2016–2021
People from Dakshin Dinajpur district
1957 births